Lysinibacillus contaminans is a Gram-positive, aerobic and endospore-forming bacterium from the genus of Lysinibacillus which has been isolated from surface water.

References

Bacillaceae
Bacteria described in 2013